Tethrisis is a genus of deep-sea bamboo coralin the family Isididae. It is monotypic with a single species, Tethrisis suzannae.

References

Isididae
Octocorallia genera